Deus is the Latin word for "god" or "deity".

Deus may also refer to:

 Deus (band), a Belgian rock band
 Deus (board game), a civilisation board game from 2014
 Deus (TV series), Israel
 Deus (video game), 1996
 Deus, a fictional entity in the video game Xenogears
 Deus, a fictional entity in the manga series Angelic Layer
 Deus, a fictional character in the manga series Mirai Nikki
 "Deus", a song by The Sugarcubes from the 1988 album Life's Too Good
 DeuS, a Belgian beer
 Deuş, a place in Romania
 Deus (film), a 2022 science-fiction film starring Claudia Black

See also

DEI (disambiguation)
Deus Ex, a series of role-playing video games
Zeus, the sky and thunder god in ancient Greek religion